Claudio Guastalla was an Italian opera librettist.

Guastalla was born in Rome on 7 November 1880 and died probably in the same city in 1948.

Especially important was his collaboration with the composer Ottorino Respighi.

Operas
Guastalla wrote fifteen libretti. Among them:
 La grazia, opera in 2 acts, music by Vincenzo Michetti, Rome, Teatro Costanzi, 31 March 1923 (after Grazia Deledda)
 Belfagor, commedia lirica in 1 prologue, 2 acts and 1 epilogue, music by Ottorino Respighi, Milan, Teatro alla Scala, 26 April 1923
 Die versunkene Glocke (La campana sommersa), opera in 4 acts, music by Ottorino Respighi, Hamburg, Stadttheater, 18 November 1927
 Odette, opera in 3 acts, music by Mario Marangolo, Brescia, Teatro Grande, 1929
 Maria egiziaca , mistero lirico in 1 act and three episodes, music by Ottorino Respighi, New York City, Carnegie Hall, 16 March 1932
 La fiamma, melodramma in 3 acts, music by Ottorino Respighi, Rome, Teatro dell'Opera, 23 January 1934
 Lucrezia , opera in 1 act, music by Ottorino Respighi, Milan, Teatro alla Scala, 24 February 1937
 Gli Orazi, opera (istoria per musica) in 1 act, music by Ennio Porrino, Milan, Teatro alla Scala, 1 February 1941

Guastalla was also the author of the subject of Respighi's ballet Belkis, regina di Saba (1932) and collaborated with Respighi for a revision (1934) of the libretto of L'Orfeo of Claudio Monteverdi.

References

Italian opera librettists
1880 births
1948 deaths
Musicians from Rome
Italian male dramatists and playwrights
20th-century Italian dramatists and playwrights
20th-century Italian male writers